The 1958 NCAA College Division basketball tournament involved 32 schools playing in a single-elimination tournament to determine the national champion of men's basketball in the NCAA College Division, predecessor to today's NCAA Divisions II and III, as a culmination of the 1957–58 NCAA College Division men's basketball season. It was won by the University of South Dakota, and Ed Smallwood of the University of Evansville was named the Most Outstanding Player.

Regional participants

Regionals

Northeast - Waltham, Massachusetts
Location: Shapiro Gym Host: Brandeis University

Third Place - Brandeis 71, RPI 69

South Central - Grambling, Louisiana
Location: Tiger Memorial Gym Host: Grambling College

Third Place - South Carolina State 80, Philander Smith 70

East - Staten Island, New York
Location: Sutter Gym Host: Wagner College

Third Place - Buffalo 77, Philadelphia Textile 73

Mideast - Evansville, Indiana
Location: Roberts Municipal Stadium Host: Evansville College

Third Place - Wabash 72, Austin Peay 69

Great Lakes - Aurora, Illinois
Location: Aurora East High School Gym Host: Wheaton College

Third Place - St. Norbert 76, Northern Illinois 70

Pacific Coast - Santa Ana, California
Location: Cook Gymnasium Host: Chapman College

Third Place - Chico State 76, Linfield 62

Southwest - Springfield, Missouri
Location: McDonald Hall and Arena Host: Southwest Missouri State College

Third Place - Arkansas State 83, Centenary 70

Midwest - Vermillion, South Dakota
Location: South Dakota Armory Host: University of South Dakota

Third Place - Wartburg 83, Gustavus Adolphus 73

*denotes each overtime played

National Finals - Evansville, Indiana
Location: Roberts Municipal Stadium Host: Evansville College

Third Place - Evansville 95, Wheaton 93

*denotes each overtime played

All-tournament team
 Jim Browne (Saint Michael's)
 Jim Daniels (South Dakota)
 Mel Peterson (Wheaton)
 Ed Smallwood (Evansville)
 Dick Zeitler (Saint Michael's)

See also
 1958 NCAA University Division basketball tournament
 1958 NAIA Basketball Tournament

References

Sources
 2010 NCAA Men's Basketball Championship Tournament Records and Statistics: Division II men's basketball Championship
 1958 NCAA College Division Men's Basketball Tournament jonfmorse.com

NCAA Division II men's basketball tournament
Tournament
NCAA College Division basketball tournament
NCAA College Division basketball tournament